Aklu Ram Mahto was an Indian politician of the Rashtriya Janata Dal. He was a member of the Bihar Legislative Assembly via Bokaro constituency.

He won the Bihar Assembly Election in 1995 with 99798 votes and defeated Samresh Singh with 69843 votes. Aklu Ram Mahto won Vidhan sabha elections in the year 1980 and 1995. He had contested Lok Sabha elections from Dhanbad on four occasions while from Giridih and Hazaribagh had tried his luck once.

Revolutionary 
Mahto had played an important role in the Jharkhand movement demand for the formation of a separate Jharkhand state within the constitutional framework of independence.

References 

Bihar MLAs 1995–2000
1940 births
2020 deaths
Bihar MLAs 1980–1985
Rashtriya Janata Dal politicians
People from Bokaro district